Diisopropylamine is a secondary amine with the chemical formula (Me2CH)2NH (Me = methyl). Diisopropylamine is a colorless liquid with an ammonia-like odor. Its lithium derivative, lithium diisopropylamide, known as LDA is a widely used reagent.

Reactions and use
Diisopropylamine is a common amine nucleophile in organic synthesis. Because it is bulky, it is a more selective nucleophile than, say, dimethylamine.

It reacts with organolithium reagents to give lithium diisopropylamide (LDA).  LDA is a strong, non-nucleophilic base

The main commercial applications of diisopropylamine is as a precursor to two herbicides, diallate and triallate, as well as certain sulfenamides used in the vulcanization of rubber.

It is also used to prepare N,N-Diisopropylethylamine (Hünig's base) by alkylation with diethyl sulfate.

The bromide salt of diisopropylamine, diisopropylammonium bromide, is a room-temperature organic ferroelectric material.

Preparation  
Diisopropylamine, which is commercially available, may be prepared by the reductive amination of acetone with ammonia using a modified copper oxide, generally copper chromite, as a catalyst: 
 

Diisopropylamine can be dried by distillation from potassium hydroxide or drying over sodium wire.

Toxicity 
Causes burns by all exposure routes. Inhalation of high vapor concentrations may cause symptoms like headache, dizziness, tiredness, nausea and vomiting.

References

Alkylamines
Diisopropylamino compounds
Secondary amines